The first Hawke ministry (Labor) was the 54th ministry of the Government of Australia. It was led by the country's 23rd Prime Minister, Bob Hawke. The first Hawke ministry succeeded the Fourth Fraser ministry, which dissolved on 11 March 1983 following the federal election that took place on 5 March which saw Labor defeat Malcolm Fraser's Liberal–National Coalition. The ministry was replaced by the second Hawke ministry on 13 December 1984 following the 1984 federal election.

Cabinet

Outer ministry

See also
 Second Hawke ministry
 Third Hawke ministry
 Fourth Hawke ministry

References

Ministries of Elizabeth II
1983 establishments in Australia
1984 disestablishments in Australia
Hawke, 1
Australian Labor Party ministries
Ministry, Hawke 1
Cabinets established in 1983
Cabinets disestablished in 1984